= Mineral waters of Azerbaijan =

== Mineral waters of Nakhchivan ==
The Badamly spring in Nakhchivan is 1274 meters above sea level.
